Kahanu Garden and Preserve is a botanical garden located on the Hana Highway (close to the  marker) near Hana, Maui, Hawaii. It is one of five gardens of the non-profit National Tropical Botanical Garden, the others being McBryde, Allerton, and Limahuli Garden and Preserve on Kauai, and The Kampong in Florida.

The garden was established in 1972 on Maui's northern coast, with rugged black lava seascapes, and is surrounded by one of Hawaii's last undisturbed hala (Pandanus tectorius) forests.

The garden's ethnobotanical collections focus on plants traditionally used by Pacific Island people. It includes the world's largest breadfruit collection, first established in the 1970s. Today the garden contains accessions of approximately 150 varieties of breadfruit collected from field expeditions to over 17 Pacific island groups in Polynesia, Micronesia, and Melanesia, as well as Indonesia, the Philippines, and the Seychelles. This collection is used for research and conservation by NTBG's Breadfruit Institute.

Other garden holdings include bamboo, banana, calabash, coconut, kava, kamani (Calophyllum inophyllum), loulu (Pritchardia arecina), sugarcane, taro, turmeric, vanilla, and bitter yam (Dioscorea bulbifera).

Kahanu Garden is open to visitors. An admission fee is charged.

Piilanihale Heiau

Kahanu Garden also contains the  Piilanihale Heiau, a National Historic Landmark believed to be the largest ancient temple in the Hawaiian Islands. The large central terrace with two separate platforms is situated on a broad ridge that adds to its majesty.

Construction of the main terrace dates back to the 14th century. Wings were later added and rededicated during the 16th century, possibly after high chief Piʻilani from western Maui conquered the beautiful, fertile, well-watered, and heavily populated Hāna region, thereby unifying the whole island.

See also
 List of botanical gardens in the United States

References

External links 

 Kahanu Garden
 Breadfruit Institute
 National Tropical Botanical Garden

Heiau
Botanical gardens in Hawaii
National Historic Landmarks in Hawaii
Protected areas of Maui
Protected areas established in 1972
1972 establishments in Hawaii
National Register of Historic Places in Maui County, Hawaii
Hawaii Register of Historic Places